Lista is a genus of snout moths. It was described by Francis Walker in 1859.

Species
 Lista carniola
 Lista ficki (Christoph, 1881)
 Lista haraldusalis (Walker, 1859)
 Lista insulsalis (Lederer, 1863)
 Lista monticola Yamanaka, 2000
 Lista plinthochroa
 Lista sumatrana
 Lista variegata (Moore, 1888)

References

Epipaschiinae
Pyralidae genera